Percival Evert Russell "Van" Vanthoff   (12 January 189430 July 1967) was a senior Australian public servant. He was Director-General of the Postmaster-General's Department from May until December 1958.

Life and career
Van Vanthoff was born in Cobram, Victoria on 12 January 1894 to parents Isaac and Mary Jane Vanthoff.

In World War I, Vanthoff served in the Australian Naval and Military Expeditionary Force.

He was appointed Director-General of Posts and Telegraphs, heading the Postmaster-General's Department, in May 1958. In the role, he oversaw development of an automatic teleprinter switching system for telegraphs, and worked to provide a six-tube coaxial cable between Sydney and Melbourne. Vanthoff retired in December 1958.

Vanthoff died on 30 July 1967 in Richmond, Melbourne.

Awards
In January 1955 Vanthoff was appointed an Officer of the Order of the British Empire.

References

1894 births
1967 deaths
Australian public servants
Australian Officers of the Order of the British Empire